Hurricane Harbor is a chain of water parks that are part of the Six Flags theme park chain. Although the parks are not identical, common features include a variety of body slides, speed slides, tube slides, wave pools, lazy rivers, and shopping areas.

History
Six Flags began using the Hurricane Harbor brand in 1995 with the opening of Six Flags Hurricane Harbor adjacent to Six Flags Magic Mountain. That same year, Wet 'n Wild in Arlington, Texas, was purchased by Six Flags. It operated as Wet 'n Wild — A Six Flags Park in 1995-1996 then was rebranded as Six Flags Hurricane Harbor in 1997. The brand has since become a trademark of the Six Flags franchise. In 1999, Six Flags St. Louis was the first Six Flags park to construct its own intra-park water attractions section. As Six Flags acquired and rebranded parks in the 2000s, some existing water parks within these theme parks were later upgraded and rebranded as Hurricane Harbor.

Only one Hurricane Harbor has closed. After Six Flags Worlds of Adventure was sold to Cedar Fair in 2004, the water park was renamed Hurricane Hannah's Waterpark. It was abandoned in 2006 and most of the attractions were relocated to a new waterpark on what used to be the marine life side of the park.

Locations

Included with admission

Six Flags America 
Hurricane Harbor is a water park located within Six Flags America. It was known as Paradise Island until 2005 when it was rebranded Hurricane Harbor.

Slides and attractions

Six Flags New England 
Hurricane Harbor is a water park located within Six Flags New England. The waterpark opened in 1997 as Island Kingdom and was rebranded Hurricane Harbor in 2003.

Slides and attractions

Six Flags Over Georgia 
Hurricane Harbor is a water park located within Six Flags Over Georgia. The water park opened in May 2014.

Slides and attractions

Six Flags St. Louis 
Hurricane Harbor is a water park located within Six Flags St. Louis.

Slides and attractions 

Former Slides and attractions

Six Flags Great Escape and Hurricane Harbor 
Hurricane Harbor is a water park located within Six Flags Great Escape and Hurricane Harbor. The waterpark opened in 1997 as Splashwater Kingdom and was rebranded Hurricane Harbor in 2019.

Slides and attractions

Six Flags Darien Lake 

The water park is located in Darien, New York. It was previously named Splashtown, and while planned for 2020, was eventually rebranded as Hurricane Harbor in 2022.

Separate admission

Six Flags Great Adventure 
Six Flags Hurricane Harbor, New Jersey is a water park located adjacent to Six Flags Great Adventure.

Slides and attractions

Six Flags Magic Mountain 
Six Flags Hurricane Harbor, Los Angeles is a water park located adjacent to Six Flags Magic Mountain.

Slides and attractions

Former Attractions

Incidents 
On September 30, 2012, a 19-year-old man fell off the Venom Drop slide that was part of the Black Snake Summit slide complex. He ignored the lifeguards and went down the slide head first on his stomach when protocol is to go down feet-first on the back. He fell off halfway down and hit the concrete. He was unconscious but breathing when he was taken to the hospital.

Six Flags Over Texas 
Six Flags Hurricane Harbor, Arlington is located across Interstate 30 from Six Flags Over Texas. It was originally a part of the Wet 'n Wild chain, but was purchased by Six Flags in 1995.

Slides and attractions

Six Flags Mexico 
Six Flags Hurricane Harbor, Oaxtepec is located in Oaxtepec, Mexico. It was originally independently owned, but was purchased by Six Flags in 2017.

Slides and attractions

Six Flags Great America 

Six Flags Hurricane Harbor, Chicago is a water park located adjacent to Six Flags Great America that opened in 2005. It opened separately to the amusement park starting in 2021.

Six Flags Hurricane Harbor Phoenix 

The water park is located in Phoenix, Arizona. Originally called Wet N' Wild Phoenix from 2009 to 2018, it was rebranded as Hurricane Harbor Phoenix for the 2019 season.

Six Flags Hurricane Harbor Splashtown 

The water park is located in Spring, Texas. It was previously owned by Six Flags. In 2019, it is rebranded as Hurricane Harbor.

Six Flags Hurricane Harbor Rockford 

The water park is located in Cherry Valley, Illinois. It was previously named Magic Waters. It is currently owned by the Rockford Park District. The park was rebranded as a Hurricane Harbor park in 2019.

Six Flags Hurricane Harbor Oklahoma City 

The water park is located in Oklahoma City, Oklahoma. It was previously named White Water Bay, and was rebranded as a Hurricane Harbor park in 2020.

Former locations

Six Flags Worlds of Adventure 
Hurricane Harbor was a defunct waterpark located within Six Flags Worlds of Adventure.

Slides and attractions

References

Hurricane Harbor
Six Flags Great Adventure
Six Flags Magic Mountain
Six Flags Over Texas
Water parks in California
Water parks in Illinois
Water parks in Maryland
Water parks in New Jersey
Water parks in Texas
Economy of Arlington, Texas
Tourist attractions in Ocean County, New Jersey
Jackson Township, New Jersey
Tourist attractions in Tarrant County, Texas
1995 establishments in the United States
Companies that filed for Chapter 11 bankruptcy in 2009